Crawford is a rural unincorporated community in Roger Mills County, Oklahoma, United States.

The post office opened September 12, 1902. The ZIP Code is 73638. It is said to have been named for the Louis Crawford ranch. 

In 1915, Crawford was home to the Crawford Telephone Company, a public service corporation that operated a switchboard in Crawford.  The town is now within the Cheyenne Boundary of the Dobson Telephone Company.

Spring Creek Lake is to the south-southwest.

References

Further reading
Shirk, George H. Oklahoma Place Names. Norman: University of Oklahoma Press, 1987.  .

Unincorporated communities in Roger Mills County, Oklahoma
Unincorporated communities in Oklahoma